Szalai may refer to:

 Furmint, a variety of wine grape
 Family name
 Ádám Szalai (born 1987), Hungarian football player
 András Szalai (born 1998), Hungarian football player
 Annamária Szalai (1961–2013), Hungarian journalist and politician
 Antal Szalai (born 1981), Hungarian violinist
 Attila Szalai (born 1998), Hungarian football player
 Dániel Szalai (born 1996), Hungarian football player
 Kévin Szalaï (born 1992), French motorcycle racer
 Pál Szalai (1915–1994), high-ranking member of the Budapest police force and the Hungarian Arrow Cross Party during World War II
 Peter Szalai (born 1962), Hungarian tabla player
 Silvia Szalai (born 1975), Hungarian-born German swimmer
 Tamás Szalai (born 1980), Hungarian football player
 Tamás Szalai (born 1984), Hungarian football player
 Vilmos Szalai (born 1991), Hungarian football player

See also 
 Szalay

Hungarian-language surnames